Insaniyat may refer to:

 Insaniyat (1955 film), a 1955 Hindi film produced and directed by S. S. Vasan
 Insaniyat (1967 film), a Pakistani Urdu-language film
 Insaaniyat (1974 film), starring Shashi Kapoor
 Insaniyat (1988 film) starring Kimi Katkar
 Insaniyat (1994 film), a 1994 Indian Hindi film directed by Tony Juneja